Jean Jacques Marie Ferdinand de Béhagle (18 July 1857 – 15 October 1899) was a French explorer of Africa.
He served with the colonial service in Algeria and travelled in the Congo and Ubangi region.
While attempting to find a viable land route from the Congo to the Mediterranean via Chad he was taken prisoner by Rabih az-Zubayr and hanged.

Early years
Jean Jacques Marie Ferdinand de Béhagle was born in Ruffec, Charente on 18 July 1857.
He became an officer of the merchant marine.
He was then employed as administrator of mixed communes in Algeria.
He served in Algeria from 1885 to 1891.
On 15 September 1885 he married Rosine Dehoux in Bône, Algeria.

In 1892, de Béhagle was a volunteer member of the exploratory expedition organized by Casimir Maistre, François Joseph Clozel and Albert Bonnel de Mézières that followed the expedition of Paul Crampel. 
The mission ascended the Congo River, then the Ubangi River, and explored the divide between the Chad and Congo Basins.
After his return, between 1893 and 1897, de Béhagle published a number of papers on the French colonization of Africa.
He was an erudite man.
De Béhagle and Paul Bourdarie (1864–1950) made speeches to the Société africaine de France in which they stressed the importance of the French colonists making a military "association" with the natives for defense of the colonies.

Expedition to Bornu

During the 1890s the Sudanese warlord Rabih az-Zubayr was actively expanding his power in the former Bornu Empire around Lake Chad. 
He built a fortress at Dikoa, to the south of Lake Chad, and attempted to obtain munitions to modernise his army from the British Royal Niger Company.
The French officer Émile Gentil reached the Chari River from the Congo in 1897, and learned that Rabih az-Zubayr had been responsible for the death of Paul Crampel. 
Gentil signed a protectorate treaty with Gaorang, Sultan of Bagirmi to the southeast of Lake Chad.

Bonnel de Mézières engaged de Béhagle for his Paris-based Syndicat commercial français des bassin do Tchad et de l'Oubangui (SCFBTO).
De Béhagle was asked to find an economically viable land route via Chad from the Congo to the Mediterranean Sea.
In 1898, de Béhagle and Toussaint Mercuri (1871–1902) left Bangui, now in the Central African Republic, destined for Chad.
De Béhagle explored the Tomi and Gribingui rivers, and found their sources.
He met Sultan Gaorang in Kouno in July 1898.

Rabih az-Zubayr now had an army of 10,000 men.
He had imposed a dictatorship on the old Bornu empire, made the sultans his vassals and imposed a law based on the Sharia.
De Béhagle was received by Rabih at Dikoa on 14 March 1899.
At first, he was treated well, but the two men soon quarrelled.
Rabih wanted to buy de Béhagle's rifles, and when he refused, threw him in prison.

Death and legacy
In 1898, Émile Gentil had been given command of a new French mission to oppose Rabih in Bagirmi.
Henri Bretonnet was sent ahead with an advance party to rescue de Béhagle, and was met by Rabih on the Chari.
Bretonnet and most of his men were killed.
Rabih ordered the execution of de Béhagle on 15 October 1899.
De Béhagle was hung and his body was thrown in a pit.
The incident made war between France and Rabih inevitable.

De Béhagle's body was recovered in 1901 by troops of colonel Georges Destenave, and buried at Fort Lamy (N'Djamena).
The rue Ferdinand-de-Béhagle was opened in Paris in 1932 in the 12th arrondissement near the Museum of African and Oceanic Arts, and was named after the explorer on 3 February 1936.

Publications
Publications by Ferdinand de Béhagle included:

Notes

Sources

1857 births
1899 deaths
French explorers
Explorers of Africa